Dead Rooster or Mertvy Piven was a Ukrainian rock band that was formed by Lyubomyr Futorsky in 1989. The first concert was given in 1990 at the first Vyvykh festival. Their debut album Eto was recorded in 1991, at the end of the Chervona Ruta festival (Chervona Ruta), where the group took first prize in the category of performers art songs. Dead Rooster began as an acoustic band. During the second half of the 1990s, they evolved into a grunge/art-rock band, though their music can't be described by one particular style. Dead Rooster has changed personnel several times.

Many songs of the band were written in lyrics of Ukrainian poets like Yuri Andrukhovych, Maksym Rylsky, Oleksandr Irvanets, Viktor Neborak, Yurko Pozayak, Serhiy Zhadan, Natalka Bilotserkivets, Ihor Kalynets and Taras Shevchenko. The album Pisni Mertvoho Pivnya is based on the Andrukhovych's poetry collection of the same name.

In 2009, their song "Kiss" ("Potsilunok") was featured in the soundtrack of Cold Souls, an American film directed by Sophie Barthes.

Members 
Current
 Roman Chayka 
 Oleh Suk 
 Alex Slobodian 
 Yurko Chopyk 
Maryan Kozovyy

Past
 Andriy Pyatakov  
 Serfym Pozdnyakov 
 Vadym Balayan 
 Lyubomyr Futorsky (died 2023)
 Andriy Nadolsky 
 Yaryna Yakubyak 
 Roman Ross 
 Ivan Nebesnyy 
 Andriy Pidkivka
 Misko Barbara (died 2021)

Discography 
 1992 - Ето (Eto)
 1993 - Мертвий півень '93 (Dead Rooster '93)
 1994 - Підземне зоо (1994) Live in studio (Pidzemne zoo (1994) Studio Live)
 1995 - Live у Львові (Live in Lviv)
 1996 - IL Testamento 
 1997 - Міський бог Ерос (Misky Boh Eros)
 1998 - Шабадабада (Shabadabada)
 2003 - Афродизіяки (Afrodiziaky)
 2006 - Пісні Мертвого Півня (Pisni Mertvoho Pivnya)
 2008 - Кримінальні сонети (Kryminalni Sonety)
 2008 - Вибраний народом (Vybrany narodom)
 2009 - Made in ЮА (Made in UA)
 2011 - Радіо Афродита (Radio Afrodyta)

References

External links 

 Official website
 Lyrics
 

1989 establishments in Ukraine
2011 disestablishments in Ukraine
Ukrainian rock music groups
Musical groups established in 1989
Musical groups disestablished in 2011
Soviet rock music groups